is a passenger railway station  located in the town of Yazu, Yazu District, Tottori Prefecture, Japan. It is operated by the third sector company Wakasa Railway.

Lines
Only local trains stop at this station.

Station layout
The station consists of one ground-level side platform serving a single bi-directional track. The wooden station building is integrated with a barber shop, and ticket sales are outsourced to the same shop, and the owner of the barber shop also serves as the station manager. The station will be unmanned on days when the barber shop is closed.

Adjacent stations

|-
!colspan=5|Wakasa Railway

History
Abe Station opened on February 5, 1932.

Passenger statistics
In fiscal 2018, the station was used by an average of 54 passengers daily.

Surrounding area
Abe Elementary School
Abe District Comprehensive Athletic Park

See also
List of railway stations in Japan

References

External links 

Railway stations in Tottori Prefecture
Railway stations in Japan opened in 1932
Yazu, Tottori